Jiří Musil may refer to:
 Jiří Musil (figure skater) (fl. 1972–1982), ice dancer for Czechoslovakia
 Jiří Musil (speed skater) (born 1965), Czech speed skater at the 1992 Winter Olympics